Gilberts is a village in Kane County, Illinois, United States. The population was 8,366 at the 2020 census.

History
The beginnings of recorded human settlement in the area of Gilberts was recorded in the War of 1812, when General Scott began waging war against the native American tribes that inhabited the area, including the Blackhawks, Alconquin, and Potawatomi. Beginning in the 1820s, European settlement in the region began. In 1840, the Potawatomi sold their land and moved westwards, making the entire area now inhabited by European settlers. In 1852, Gilberts Station opened, named after the Gilberts, the largest landowners in the area. Specifically, Amasa Gilbert, a pioneer who was a part of the Gilberts family.  In 1855, the Gilberts sold their land to Elijah Wilcox. 

Opening in 1907, the Elgin and Belvidere Electric Company opened the "Elgin and Belvidere Electric Railway", connecting Elgin, Illinois to Belvidere, Illinois, with a stop at Gilberts. During the Great Depression, many businesses in the area went bankrupt, including the Elgin and Belvidere Electric Company in 1930. In 1930, Route 72 also opened up, connecting Gilberts to the outside world. 

In 1988, George Bush visited the town during his election campaign.

Geography
Gilberts is located in northern Kane County at  (42.100511, -88.366057). Most of the village is in Rutland Township, with a small portion crossing to the east into Dundee Township. The village limits extend north to the McHenry County line. Gilberts is bordered to the east by the village of West Dundee and the city of Elgin.

Demographics

2020 Census

Note: the US Census treats Hispanic/Latino as an ethnic category. This table excludes Latinos from the racial categories and assigns them to a separate category. Hispanics/Latinos can be of any race.

2000 Census
As of the census of 2000, there were 1,279 people, 394 households, and 351 families residing in the village. The racial makeup of the village was 95.86% White, 0.16% African American, 0.31% Native American, 1.64% Asian, 1.56% from other races, and 0.47% from two or more races. Hispanic or Latino of any race were 3.36% of the population.

There were 394 households, out of which 51.0% had children under the age of 18 living with them, 79.9% were married couples living together, 6.3% had a female householder with no husband present, and 10.7% were non-families. 8.9% of all households were made up of individuals, and 2.0% had someone living alone who was 65 years of age or older.  The average household size was 3.25 and the average family size was 3.43.

In the village, the population was spread out, with 31.5% under the age of 18, 7.6% from 18 to 24, 31.2% from 25 to 44, 25.7% from 45 to 64, and 4.0% who were 65 years of age or older.  The median age was 36 years. For every 100 females, there were 98.3 males.  For every 100 females age 18 and over, there were 100.0 males.

The median income for a household in the village was $87,847, and the median income for a family was $92,433. Males had a median income of $57,300 versus $32,375 for females. The per capita income for the village was $31,898.  None of the families and 0.6% of the population were living below the poverty line, including no under eighteens and 5.1% of those over 64.

Municipal broadband
Gilberts is planning to issue general obligation bonds to create a village-owned internet access provider upon the ashes of an earlier failed attempt from a private sector project.

Education
Gilberts is located in Community Unit School District 300. Children who reside in Gilberts attend Hampshire High School.

Gilberts Elementary School Is an elementary school for grades K-5. The school used to have a pre-k or preschool
program.
Hampshire Middle School and Dundee Middle School are the Middle schools that feed into Hampshire High School.  Cambridge Lakes Charter School is also an option for residents in district.

Parks and recreation
Town Center Park

This is the new, large park that is now open.  A parking lot is being installed which will accommodate over 80 vehicles.

The park is a  space and will be home to many sports teams such as the YMCA's baseball and soccer teams.

Town Square Park

This centrally located park is near Lake Gilberts and features a new gazebo.

Memorial Park

Memorial Park offers the following amenities:  baseball diamond, soccer field, playground, fishing pond, picnic pavilion, a small skate park and a  basketball court.

Skate Park

This Governor's Home Town Award-winning skate park is located in Memorial Park.

Waitcus Park

Waitcus Park features a baseball diamond, basketball court (1/2 court), playground, fishing pond and a picnic pavilion.

Sports

Gilberts is the home to the GPH Grizzlies Football Team that plays in the TCYFL. It has two Super Bowl runner-ups and two championships. The team was founded in 2008 and has 3 separate sides, Bantams, Feather, and Middleweights.

References

External links
 Village of Gilberts official website

Villages in Illinois
Villages in Kane County, Illinois
Populated places established in 1890
1890 establishments in Illinois